Koji Kuriyama (born 11 July 1960) is a Japanese luger. He competed in the men's singles and doubles events at the 1980 Winter Olympics.

References

1960 births
Living people
Japanese male lugers
Olympic lugers of Japan
Lugers at the 1980 Winter Olympics
Sportspeople from Hokkaido